Uniform law may refer to:

Uniform distribution (disambiguation), any of several concepts in mathematics
Uniform Act, a model statute designed to be adopted by many jurisdictions
A body of harmonised laws, see harmonisation of law
Dress code
School uniform rules or regulations